What's That Sound? is the third studio album by American music artist Haley Reinhart, released on September 22, 2017 by Concord Records, and produced by Reinhart and John Burk. An homage to music from the late 1960s, it features 14 tracks on the standard release, with two bonus tracks on the Target exclusive edition.

Lead single "Baby It's You" was released June 16, 2017, followed by "For What It's Worth" on August 11, 2017 and "Let's Start" on September 15, 2017.  "The Letter" was also released on July 13, 2017, as a promotional single. The album debuted at 67 on Billboard's Top Album Sales Chart.

Production
Concord first pitched the idea of Reinhart doing a covers album. Reinhart agreed since her deepest memories are of classic rock songs in the repertoire of her parents' 1960s cover band, Midnight. The result, What's That Sound, features most of her favorite classic-rock and pop songs, all of which were originally released between the years of 1967 and 1969.

What's That Sound? was recorded to tape at Sunset Sound Recorders using analog recording and vintage instruments, to achieve a sound "true to the era." Each song on the album was recorded live in the studio as a band, and most of the raw takes were kept for finalized tracks. The album was produced by Concord President John Burk and co-produced by Reinhart. Bill Schnee mixed the album, Reinhart's father, Harry, provided guitar, Reinhart's mother, Patti, sang backup vocals, Scott Bradlee played piano for three tracks, while Casey Abrams was featured vocalist on two tracks and instrumentalist on several others. With the album, Reinhart wanted to draw connections between the 1960s and the present day, describing both as "turbulent, yet hopeful times," and she also wanted to spread the idea of "people coming together through love and music" and hopes that the album will help listeners "become more aware and more in tune with each other."

Commercial performance
What's That Sound? debuted at 67 on Billboard's Top Album Sales chart, for the week dated October 14, 2017.

Promotion

2017 fall headlining solo tour
In support of the album, Reinhart embarked on an 18-show headlining fall tour throughout the US, commencing October 22, 2017, and concluding November 18, 2017.

Track listing
All songs and credits adapted from:

Personnel
Album credits adapted from:

Haley Reinhart: Composer, producer, Vocals, Background Vocals
Casey Abrams: Bass (Upright), Featured Artist, Melodica, Vocals, Background Vocals
Paul Blakemore: Mastering
Scott Bradlee: Featured Artist, Piano
John Burk: Producer, Guitar
George Doering: Guitar
Thomas Drayton: Background Vocals
Anders Grahn: Bass, composer, Congas, Guitar, Keyboards, Background Vocals
Martin Guigui: Hammond B3, Keyboards, Piano
Rob Kleiner: Additional Production, composer
Monika Lightstone: Photography
Mike Merritt: Bass
Seth Present: Engineer
Harry Reinhart: Guitar
Patti Reinhart: Background Vocals
Bill Schnee: Engineer, Mixing
Mike Shapiro: Drums, Percussion
Carrie Smith: Cover Design
Morgan Stratton: Assistant Engineer
Sean Winter: Package Design

Charts

References

2017 albums
Haley Reinhart albums
Concord Records albums
Traditional pop albums